The Los Angeles Film Critics Association Award for Best Lead Performance is an award given annually by the Los Angeles Film Critics Association. It was first introduced in 2022, after it was announced that the four acting categories would be retired and replaced with two gender neutral categories, with both Best Actor and Best Actress merging into the Best Lead Performance category.

Winners
 † = Winner of the Academy Award for Best Actor or Best Actress
 ‡ = Nominated for the Academy Award for Best Actor or Best Actress

2020s

See also
 National Board of Review Award for Best Actor
 National Board of Review Award for Best Actress
 National Society of Film Critics Award for Best Actor
 National Society of Film Critics Award for Best Actress
 New York Film Critics Circle Award for Best Actor
 New York Film Critics Circle Award for Best Actress

References

L
Film awards for lead actor
Film awards for lead actress